Cometaster is a monotypic moth genus of the family Erebidae erected by George Hampson in 1913. Its only species, Cometaster pyrula, the faint owl moth or ying-yang moth, was first described by Carl Heinrich Hopffer in 1857.

Distribution
It is found in Eastern and Southern Africa, mainly in Botswana, the Democratic Republic of the Congo, Malawi, Mozambique, South Africa, Zambia and Zimbabwe.

Biological control agent
In October 2004, as part of a biological control project, larvae of this moth from South Africa were released in Queensland, Australia, in order to keep under control the type of acacia Acacia nilotica subsp. indica, a major invasive species in the Mitchell Grass Downs.

References

External links

"The host range and biology of Cometaster pyrula; a biocontrol agent for Acacia nilotica subsp. indica in Australia"

Moths described in 1857
Hypopyrini
Lepidoptera of the Democratic Republic of the Congo
Lepidoptera of Malawi
Lepidoptera of Mozambique
Lepidoptera of South Africa
Lepidoptera of Zambia
Lepidoptera of Zimbabwe
Monotypic moth genera
Moths of Sub-Saharan Africa